Henry Norris Churton (15 January 1843 – 20 January 1904) was an Anglican colonial bishop in the 20th century.

Churton was born in 1843 into an ecclesiastical family, the son of Edward Churton, Archdeacon of Cleveland. He was educated at Eton and University College, Oxford; and ordained in 1868. His first posts were curacies at Stoke-on-Trent and East Retford. From 1872 to 1879 he was Vicar of St John Evangelist, West Bromwich then Perpetual Curate of St James’ Chapel, Avonwick. Later he was Archdeacon of the Bahamas before being ordained to the episcopate in 1902, succeeding his elder brother (Edward) as Bishop of Nassau. He was consecrated bishop by the Archbishop of Canterbury at St Paul's Cathedral on 13 July 1902. He had previously received the honorary degree Doctor of Divinity (DD) from the University of Oxford in May 1902.

He died in a yachting accident on 20 January 1904.

Notes

1843 births
1904 deaths
People educated at Eton College
Alumni of University College, Oxford
Archdeacons of the Bahamas
20th-century Anglican bishops in the Caribbean
Anglican bishops of Nassau
Deaths by drowning
Boating accident deaths
British expatriates in the Bahamas